Jethro Felemi (born in Tonga) is a Tongan rugby union player who plays for the  in Super Rugby. His playing position is prop. He was named in the Reds squad for round 7 of the Super Rugby AU competition in 2020.

Reference list

External links
Rugby.com.au profile
itsrugby.co.uk profile

Tongan rugby union players
Living people
Rugby union props
Tonga international rugby union players
1994 births
North Harbour rugby union players
Queensland Country (NRC team) players
Queensland Reds players